Moiremont is a commune in the Marne department in north-eastern France.

Places & Monuments

Moiremont abbey is a former Benedictine abbey founded in 707 in the form of a congregation. In 1074, Reims' Archbishop, Manasses II sent benedictions and gave a foundation chart on Odalric's demand.  Pierre Pérignon, born in Sainte-Menehould in 1639, joined the congregation when he was around 16 before joining Saint-Vannes abbey in Verdun where he became a monk under the famous name Dom Pérignon.  The only remaining part of the abbey to this day is the Abbatial church which was reformed into a Parochial church after the French Revolution.
 Saint-Placide wash house.
 Timber framing houses.

See also
Communes of the Marne department

References

Communes of Marne (department)